Makham is a district (amphoe) in the centre of Chanthaburi province, eastern Thailand.

History
The district was established in 1899, then named Tha Luang District. It dates back to an ancient Khmer city, which was under Thai rule since the Ayutthaya era. In 1917, it was renamed Makham.

Geography
Neighboring districts are (from the southwest clockwise) Mueang Chanthaburi, Khao Khitchakut, Pong Nam Ron, and Khlung of Chanthaburi Province.

The important water resource is the Chanthaburi River.

Administration
The district is divided into six sub-districts (tambons), which are further subdivided into 59 villages (mubans). Makham is a sub-district municipality (thesaban tambon) which covers parts of tambon Makham. There are a further six tambon administrative organizations (TAO).

Missing numbers are tambon which now form Khao Khitchakut District.

References

External links
amphoe.com (Thai)

Makham